Acanthodoris metulifera is a species of sea slug, a dorid nudibranch, a shell-less marine gastropod mollusc in the family Onchidorididae.

Distribution 
This species was described from the north-west coast of Tasmania, Australia. It has not been reported since the original description and may be synonymous with Acanthodoris nanega and Acanthodoris globosa.

References

Onchidorididae
Gastropods described in 1905